Mobarakabad, also rendered as Mubarakabad, may refer to:

 Mobarakabad, East Azerbaijan
 Mobarakabad, Estahban, Fars Province
 Mobarakabad, Pasargad, Fars Province
 Mobarakabad, Hakhamanish, Pasargad County, Fars Province
 Mobarakabad, Qir and Karzin, Fars Province
 Mobarakabad, Rasht, Gilan Province
 Mobarakabad, Kuchesfahan, Rasht County, Gilan Province
 Mobarakabad, Shaft, Gilan Province
 Mobarakabad, Golestan
 Mobarakabad, Kabudarahang, Hamadan Province
 Mobarakabad, Malayer, Hamadan Province
 Mobarakabad, Tuyserkan, Hamadan Province
 Mobarakabad, Isfahan
 Mobarakabad, alternate name of Allahabad, Lenjan, Isfahan Province
 Mobarakabad, Natanz, Isfahan Province
 Mobarakabad, Kerman
 Mobarakabad, Kurdistan
 Mobarakabad, Dehgolan, Kurdistan Province
 Mobarakabad-e Sepidar, Kurdistan Province
 Mobarakabad, Lorestan
 Mobarakabad, Arak, Markazi Province
 Mobarakabad, Tafresh, Markazi Province
 Mobarakabad, Qom
 Mobarakabad, South Khorasan
 Mobarabakabad, alternate name of Karijgan, South Khorasan
 Mobarakabad, West Azerbaijan
 Mobarakabad, Zanjan
 Mobarakabad Rural District, Fars Province